Duncan is the name of two places in the U.S. state of Kentucky in the United States of America:

Duncan, Casey County, Kentucky 
Duncan, Mercer County, Kentucky